Eldoret Airport is an international airport in Kenya.

Location

Eldoret Airport, is located in the city of Eldoret, in Uasin Gishu County, in the midwestern Kenya, close to the International border with Uganda.

Overview
Eldoret International Airport is a large airport that serves the city of Eldoret and the surrounding communities.

History
The airport was established in 1995. It is administered by the Kenya Airports Authority. Currently the airport has two scheduled International cargo flights and several ad hoc freighters per week. The airport is open from Monday to Sunday from 03.30 hours to 17.30 hours GMT, but the hours can be extended on request. Currently the airport has three scheduled international cargo flights and several ad hoc freighters per week.

Eldoret International Airport was built with the vision of achieving accelerated economic growth, through integration and opening up of the Western region to local and international markets. The airport is also expected to promote the exploitation of the rich tourism circuit of Western Kenya, which is largely unexploited.

Airlines and destinations

Passenger numbers

See also
 Eldoret
 Uasin Gishu County
 List of airports in Kenya

References

External links

 Kenya Airports Authority – Eldoret International Airport

Airports in Kenya
Airports in Rift Valley Province
Eldoret
Uasin Gishu County